

Buildings and structures

Buildings

 St Edmund's Church, Southwold in England is completed.
 Church of St. Valentin, Kiedrich in Hesse (Germany) is completed.
 1490
 Bara Gumbad in Delhi is built.
 Probable completion of rebuilding of Sherborne Abbey choir, England, with a Perpendicular style fan vault by William Smyth.
 All Saints' Church, Wittenberg (Schloßkirche), designed by Conrad Pflüger, begun.
 Former Nea Ekklesia church in Constantinople destroyed by a lightning strike.
 1493 – Tomb of Bibi Jawindi at Uch in the Punjab region is built.
 1495 – Monastery of Jesus of Setúbal in Portugal, designed by Diogo de Boitaca, is completed.
 1497 – Rebuilding of Holy Trinity Church, Long Melford in England is completed.
 1407 – Santa Maria delle Grazie in Milan, Italy is completed.
 1498 – Church of St Martin, Landshut, Bavaria (Germany) is completed by Hans von Burghausen.
 1499
 Garden loggia and external spiral staircase at Palazzo Contarini del Bovolo in Venice, probably designed by Giorgio Spavento, completed.
 Start of construction of Abbaye de la Trinité, Vendôme.

Births
 c. 1495 – Diego Siloe, Spanish Renaissance architect and sculptor (died 1563)

Deaths
 1490 – William Smyth, English architect
 c. 1493 – Enna Swarviski (born c. 1427)
 1494 (last record) – Luca Fancelli, Italian architect and sculptor (born c. 1430)

References

Architecture